Jung Kyung-eun (Hangul: 정경은;  or  ; born 20 March 1990) is a South Korean professional badminton player. She was the 2016 Summer Olympics bronze medalist in the women's doubles event.

Career 
Jung Kyung-eun began her career competing in singles, but now concentrates on doubles. She has attained the most success with her women's doubles partner Kim Ha-na. In April 2012, they won their first major title at the 2012 India Open. In the mixed doubles she has recently partnered with Kim Ki-jung; however, they have not achieved the same level of results as they have had in doubles with their respective genders.

At the 2012 Summer Olympics, Jung and her partner Kim Ha-na, along with Ha Jung-eun and Kim Min-jung of South Korea, Wang Xiaoli and Yu Yang of China, and Meiliana Jauhari and Greysia Polii of Indonesia were disqualified from the competition for "not using one's best efforts to win a match" and "conducting oneself in a manner that is clearly abusive or detrimental to the sport" following matches the previous evening during which they were accused of trying to lose in order to manipulate the draw.  Jung and her partner Kim Ha-na played against China's Wang Xiaoli and Yu Yang.  South Korea filed an appeal to the Badminton World Federation at the Olympics,  but it was rejected.

Jung competed at the 2014 Asian Games, and won the bronze medal together with the national women's team.

At the 2016 Olympics she and doubles partner Shin Seung-chan won the bronze medal.

In 2017, she helped the Korean national team to win the world team championships at the Sudirman Cup.

Achievements

Olympic Games 
Women's doubles

Asian Championships 
Women's doubles

BWF World Junior Championships 
Girls' doubles

Asian Junior Championships 
Girls' doubles

BWF World Tour (5 titles, 2 runners-up) 
The BWF World Tour, which was announced on 19 March 2017 and implemented in 2018, is a series of elite badminton tournaments sanctioned by the Badminton World Federation (BWF). The BWF World Tour is divided into levels of World Tour Finals, Super 1000, Super 750, Super 500, Super 300 (part of the HSBC World Tour), and the BWF Tour Super 100.

Women's doubles

BWF Superseries (3 titles, 4 runners-up) 
The BWF Superseries, which was launched on 14 December 2006 and implemented in 2007, is a series of elite badminton tournaments, sanctioned by the Badminton World Federation (BWF). BWF Superseries levels are Superseries and Superseries Premier. A season of Superseries consists of twelve tournaments around the world that have been introduced since 2011. Successful players are invited to the Superseries Finals, which are held at the end of each year.

Women's doubles

  BWF Superseries Finals tournament
  BWF Superseries Premier tournament
  BWF Superseries tournament

BWF Grand Prix (9 titles, 6 runners-up) 
The BWF Grand Prix had two levels, the BWF Grand Prix and Grand Prix Gold. It was a series of badminton tournaments sanctioned by the Badminton World Federation (BWF) which was held from 2007 to 2017.

Women's doubles

Mixed doubles

  BWF Grand Prix Gold tournament
  BWF Grand Prix tournament

BWF International Challenge/Series (4 titles, 3 runners-up) 
Women's doubles

Mixed doubles

  BWF International Challenge tournament
  BWF International Series tournament

Record against selected opponents 

Women's doubles results with Kim Ha-na against Super Series finalists, World Championships semifinalists, and Olympic quarterfinalists.

  Leanne Choo & Renuga Veeran 1–0
  Alex Bruce & Michelle Li 1–0
  Xia Huan & Tang Jinhua 0–2
  Wang Xiaoli & Yu Yang 0–5
  Tian Qing & Zhao Yunlei 0–5
  Bao Yixin & Zhong Qianxin 1–3
  Bao Yixin & Tian Qing 1–0
  Bao Yixin & Cheng Shu 0–1
  Ma Jin & Tang Jinhua 1–1
  Luo Ying & Luo Yu 3–4
  Tang Yuanting & Yu Yang 0–1
  Cheng Wen-hsing & Chien Yu-chin 1–2
  Christinna Pedersen & Kamilla Rytter Juhl 2–3
  Poon Lok Yan & Tse Ying Suet 2–0
  Jwala Gutta & Ashwini Ponnappa 2–1
  Vita Marissa & Nadya Melati 1–0
  Mizuki Fujii & Reika Kakiiwa 3–1
  Miyuki Maeda & Satoko Suetsuna 3–0
  Shizuka Matsuo & Mami Naito 3–2
  Misaki Matsutomo & Ayaka Takahashi 6–3
  Reika Kakiiwa & Miyuki Maeda 2–2
  Ha Jung-eun & Kim Min-jung 1–3
  Chin Eei Hui & Wong Pei Tty 2–0
  Shinta Mulia Sari & Yao Lei 1–0
  Duanganong Aroonkesorn & Kunchala Voravichitchaikul 2–0

References

External links 

 
 

1990 births
Living people
Sportspeople from South Gyeongsang Province
South Korean female badminton players
Badminton players at the 2012 Summer Olympics
Badminton players at the 2016 Summer Olympics
Olympic badminton players of South Korea
Olympic bronze medalists for South Korea
Olympic medalists in badminton
Medalists at the 2016 Summer Olympics
Badminton players at the 2014 Asian Games
Asian Games silver medalists for South Korea
Asian Games medalists in badminton
Medalists at the 2014 Asian Games
21st-century South Korean women
20th-century South Korean women